The Law on integration (Dutch: Wet inburgering) obliges most immigrants who are not citizens of the EU, Switzerland, Turkey, or the European Economic Area countries to learn Dutch and pass an exam within a few years of their arrival in the Netherlands. Since first appearing in draft form as part of a proposal in the House of Representatives, the exam has proven to be highly controversial. It continues to be both a subject of controversy, and even ridicule, in the Netherlands.

According to a separate law, known in Dutch as the Wet inburgering in het buitenland, certain classes of prospective immigrants must also pass a test involving basic knowledge of Dutch and Dutch society even before they first enter the Netherlands.

Introduction
Specific programs devoted to integration did exist before 2007. Between 1998 and 2007, new immigrants were obligated to follow an integration course that contained implemented standards on a national level. The courses were financed by the government and organized by local municipalities. There was, however, no compulsory test. Immigrants were fined only if they did not take the course without a valid reason.

The Law on Integration, drafted by Rita Verdonk, was passed by the House of Representatives (Tweede Kamer) on July 7, 2006, and the Senate (Eerste Kamer) on November 28, 2006, and was put into effect on January 1, 2007. It laid the groundwork for the current program, which is known as inburgering.

Inburgering is a requirement for residents who have relocated to the Netherlands from countries outside of the European Union, in addition to others in certain circumstances. After a period of three-and-a-half years (five years for some), they must pass an exam that evaluates various aspects of their integration. The current exam consists of six parts. Four measure Dutch language skills and include components that test an immigrants' speaking, listening, writing and reading abilities. The fifth tests their knowledge of Dutch society. The sixth portion, introduced in 2015, assesses their understanding of the Dutch labor market.

The obligation to take the test currently applies not only to new immigrants, but also to some who have lived in the Netherlands for five years or longer.

Prior to traveling to the Netherlands

A similar obligation exists for some foreigners wishing to relocate to the Netherlands, especially people wanting to marry a resident or a citizen. These rules can be found in another law titled the Wet inburgering in het buitenland (“Integration law for Immigrants to the Netherlands Abroad”). The exam is requirement to receive a temporary long stay residence permit (Dutch: MVV) and is usually taken at a Dutch embassy.

Failure to meet the obligations

Since the obligation was introduced for people entering after January 1, 2007, the law had no consequences for people failing to fulfill their obligations until July 1, 2010.

Local city councils are responsible for making sure that those obliged to take the exam do so. Failure to pass the test within the allotted time can result in financial penalties. The specifics depend on the resident's place of residence and can total anywhere from several hundred to more than 1,000 euros. However, residents can request additional time to prepare for the exam if their reasons for not adhering to their obligation is deemed sufficient. Contrary to popular belief, a resident cannot be denied residency because they have not passed the exam.

Exceptions
The law does not apply to:
 Dutch nationals who reside abroad (see below for earlier drafts of the law)
 citizens of fellow EU countries, EEA countries, Switzerland and their legal spouses who are non EU nationals.
 minors (under the age of 18)
 retirees as per to retirement age in Netherlands (over the age of 66)
 residents who have certified diplomas, certificates etc. from certified Dutch-language institutions, for example Surinamese people;
 temporary foreign workers of Dutch employers or companies which are based in or operate within Netherlands
 temporary foreign and exchanges students and other academic researchers

In 2010, a Dutch judge ruled that the law ought not to be extended to Turkish citizens, because of an association treaty between the European Union and Turkey.

Implementation and cost
Dutch municipalities are responsible for the implementation of the law.

As of June 2011, the courses, which can cost several thousand euros, may be subsidized by the government in certain circumstances. However, beginning in 2013, these resources became increasingly limited.

Controversy

 It is claimed that the Netherlands is the only country in the world that imposes integration and language requirements on persons still living abroad.
 Many news organizations, both in the Netherlands and elsewhere, have criticized the exam and noted that it only further supports negative, xenophobic attitudes towards immigrants in the country.
 The test's Kennis van de Nederlandse Samenleving (“Knowledge of Dutch Society”) section, which tests an immigrant's knowledge of Dutch society, has been widely criticized for its bizarre, patronizing and even inane questions. One example includes, “What should you do if the television is on while you are vacuuming?” Several Dutch news organizations have aired segments or run stories where they ask lifelong Dutch residents to take this section of the exam themselves. Most fail it, suggesting its inability to properly represent Dutch society.
 This law originally proposed obligations for Dutch nationals from (Aruba and the Netherlands Antilles) wishing to enter Dutch territory. Young people from these countries are over-represented in crime figures, and not all of them speak Dutch well, or not as their first language. However, it was not possible to identify people from the Dutch Caribbean as such, so all Dutch nationals were initially covered, except for those who had spent more than 8 years of their childhood in the Netherlands. The intention was to pinpoint residents of the Dutch Caribbean. This plan was abandoned after legal advice from the Council of State (Raad van State), declared it unconstitutional. The law now applies to about 250,000 people in the Netherlands.
 One highly controversial provision was that some people would have to pay for any Dutch language training themselves, and receive a reimbursement only if they went on to pass the exam. This has been abandoned in practice, though not in theory.
 Despite widespread controversy, only one member of the House of Representatives, Fatma Koşer Kaya (D66), voted against it. In the Senate, four smaller political parties opposed it, totaling 13 out of 75 Senators.

References

External links
Civic integration examination abroad introduced website of the Immigratie en Naturalisatiedienst
newspaper article Dutch language in Trouw
The Netherlands: Discrimination in the Name of Integration article dated May 13, 2008 by Human Rights Watch
Pass this test, Dutch tell immigrants From The Sunday Times June 18, 2006, by Nicola Smith
http://www.spiegel.de/international/0,1518,397021,00.html der Spiegel English version
https://www.nd.nl/nieuws/opinie/soms-kan-geeiste-inburgering-echt-niet.436728.lynkx  Dutch article dated September 2014 about the xenophobic unjust  and racist effects of this legislation, based upon the experience of a long term Indonesian resident.

Citizenship tests
Law of the Netherlands
Netherlands educational programs
Immigration to the Netherlands
Immigration law